El Trabuco Venezolano Vol. IV is a studio vinyl LP by Venezuelan musician Alberto Naranjo, originally released in 1984 and partially reedited in two CDs titled El Trabuco Venezolano 1977 - 1984 Vol. 1 (1994) and Vol. 2 (1995). It is the sixth of seven albums (two live albums) of the El Trabuco Venezolano musical project arranged and directed by Naranjo. The art cover include an article, signed by Humberto Márquez, entitled La flor y nata (crème de la crème or creme of the crop), which is also used to refer to this LP.

Personnel
 Alberto Naranjo - drums, arranger, director on all tracks;timbales (dubbed) on tracks 2, 3, 5, 6
 Samuel del Real - piano on all tracks
 Lorenzo Barriendos - bass guitar on all tracks, except on 2
 José Velázquez - bass guitar on track 2
 José Navarro - timbales on tracks 1, 4, 7, 8
 Orlando Poleo - congas on all tracks, except on 2
 Felipe Rengifo - congas on track 2, quinto on track 8
 William Mora - bongos on all tracks, except on 2
 Jesús Quintero - bongos on track 2
 Gustavo Aranguren - trumpet or flugel horn in all tracks(four parts, dubbed - flugels only on track 2)
 Rafael Silva - trombone on all tracks(three parts, dubbed - four parts on track 8)
 Carlos Daniel Palacios - lead singer on tracks 1, 8 and chorus on 3, 7
 Ricardo Quintero - lead singer on track 2
 Joe Ruiz - lead singer on tracks 3, 7 and chorus on 7, 8
 Carlos Espósito - lead singer on track 5 and chorus on 3, 7, 8

Guests
 Pedro Vilela - Puerto Rican cuatro on track 1
 Víctor Jiménez - lead singer on track 6
 Los Cuñaos (directed by Alí Agüero) - chorus on all tracks, except on 4
 Manuel Freire - saxophone on track 4(five parts: soprano, alto, 2 tenors, baritone; all dubbed)
 Strings section' on all tracks, except on 4
Violins: Alberto Flamini (concertmaster), Carmelo Russo, Sigfrido Chiva, Grigorije Girovski,Angel Gimeno, Luciano Stecconi, Giulio Remersaro, Nil Nicolau
Violas: José Olmedo, Osane Ibáñez
Cellos: Bogdan Trochanowski, Mario Arias

Track listing

Other credits
 Artistic and executive producer: Orlando Montiel
 Musical director and associate producer: Alberto Naranjo
 Production manager: Rafael Rivas
 Staff coordinator: Freddy Sanz
 Photos: Mario Abate (cover) and Orlando Montiel (back)
 Texts: Humberto Márquez (cover) and Lil Rodríguez (back)
 Label: Jerm'z Records C. A. - LPJ/CJ-3222 (P)
 Place of Recording: Estudios Audio Suárez
 Recording and mixing engineers: Gustavo and Mario Quintero M. and Alberto Naranjo
 Produced in Caracas, Venezuela, 1984

External links
Anapapaya.com
Salsa2u.com
Sincopa.com
Venciclopedia.com - La flor y nata

1984 albums
Alberto Naranjo albums